de Galard may refer to:

Geneviève de Galard (b. 1925), French nurse
Gustave de Galard (1779-1841), French painter and designer
René de Galard de Béarn, Marquis de Brassac (1699-1771), French soldier and amateur composer

See also
De Galard Family